Acareosperma is a plant genus in the family Vitaceae. The sole species is Acareosperma spireanum.

Distribution

A. spireanum is an endemic species found in Laos, Asia.

References

External links
 
 

Vitaceae
Vitaceae genera
Monotypic rosid genera